Lady Hannah Ellice (or Lady Hannah Ellis) was launched in 1812 as a West Indiaman. Later, she traded more widely, including making two voyages to India under a license from the British East India Company. She survived two maritime misadventures but suffered a final wrecking in August 1838.

Career
Lady Hannah Ellis first appeared in Lloyd's Register (LR) in 1812 with Lawton, master, Chalmers & Co. owners, and trade London–West Indies

A dreadful hurricane on 21 October 1817 devastated the harbour of Castries, Saint Lucia, and drove Lady Hannah Ellice, and 11 other vessels on shore.

On 3 November 1825 a gale at Milford Haven drove Lady Hannah Ellice into the lazaretto and other vessels under quarantine; she lost her bowsprit, foremast and head. She then ran aground on the mudflats near the dockyard. She was on a voyage from Alexandria, Egypt to London.

Sailed from Bombay on 12 June 1828 and arrived in the Downs end-September 1828.

On 23 December 1828 sailed for Bengal from Gravesend, but she sprang a leak and had to return on 28 December. She arrived at Bengal on 1 June 1829.  She sailed from Calcutta on 6 August and Saugor on 17 August.

Fate
Lady Hannah Ellice was wrecked on 27 August 1838 on The Triangles. She was on a voyage from British Honduras to London.

Notes, citations, and references
Notes

Citations

References

1812 ships
Age of Sail merchant ships of England
Maritime incidents in 1817
Maritime incidents in November 1825
Maritime incidents in August 1838